Milan Grubanov (born 30 April 1978) is a Serbian handball player, currently playing for Liga ASOBAL side BM Ciudad Encantada.

Grubanov has made several appearances for the Serbian national handball team.

Grubanov played for Proleter Naftagas, RK Toza Markovic, Djurgårdens IF, Bjerringbro-Silkeborg Håndbold and Viborg HK.

References

External links
 Player info

1978 births
Living people
Liga ASOBAL players
Serbian male handball players
RK Proleter Zrenjanin players
Djurgårdens IF Handboll players
Viborg HK players